Highway 85 is an east-west highway in Northern Israel.  It is one of the most important roads through the Galilee, connecting the western Galilee with the Eastern Galilee.  The road begins in Akko on the west coast of Israel and ends in the east just north of Lake Kinneret.

The road begins at Highway 4 in Akko in the west, and ends at Amiad junction at Highway 90 near Korzim in the east.  It is 37 km long.  The route from Akko to Hananya junction has been used for transportation since ancient times and passes through the Beit HaKerem valley.

Junctions and Interchanges on the highway

 Akko
 Tel Akko junction with 
 Akko east junction with Highway 4 (Israel)
 Kfar Yassif junction with highway 70
 Ahihud junction with highway 70
There are plans to replace the two junctions at Ahihud and Kfar Yasif with one interchange.
 Tzurit-Gilon
 Majdal Krum
 Bi'ana junction
 Karmiel west junction with route 784 (Israel)
The Junction karmiel west will be Interchange
 Karmiel junction
 Nahaf
 Kamana-Mikhmanim-Kamon
 Shezur
 Sajur
 Rama junction with route 864 (Israel)
 Moran (kibbutz)
 Kfar Hananya
 Halafta junction
 Nahal Amud Interchange Highway 65 (Israel)
 Kahal Interchange 
 Amiad Interchange with Highway 90 (Israel)

See also
Railway to Karmiel
List of highways in Israel

85